A fight song is a rousing short song associated with a sports team. The term is most common in the United States and Canada. In Australia, Mexico, and New Zealand these songs are called the team anthem, team song, or games song. First associated with collegiate sports, fight songs are also used by secondary schools and in professional sports.

Fight songs are sing-alongs, allowing sports fans to cheer collectively for their team. These songs are commonly played several times at a sporting event. For example, the band might play the fight song when entering the stadium, whenever their team scores, or while cheerleaders dance at halftime or during other breaks in the game. In Australian Rules Football, the team song is traditionally sung by the winning team at the end of the game.

Some fight songs have a long history, connecting the fans who sing them to a time-honored tradition, frequently to music played by the institution's band. An analysis of 65 college fight songs by FiveThirtyEight identified words commonly used in the lyrics of these songs, including fight, win, and victory. Other common elements of fight song lyrics are mentioning the team's colors, spelling out the school's name, and using the words “hail” and "rah." The lyrics for many songs were composed by students, alumni, or faculty of the institution and are often paired with a pre-existing tune or another college's fight song. However, some composers are more famous than the fight song: Cole Porter wrote "Bulldog" for his alma mater Yale College.

Hundreds of colleges have fight songs, most originating from the early 20th century in connection with football. The first collegiate fight song in the United States is Boston College's "For Boston", written and composed by T. J. Hurley in 1885. One of the oldest fight songs in Australia is Melbourne Grammar School's "Play Together, Dark Blue Twenty" dating to before 1893.  In 1997, USA Today selected "Aggie War Hymn", the fight song of Texas A&M University, as the number one college football fight song in the United States.

Although used similarly, stadium anthems differ from fight songs because they are not written specifically for a sports team. Fight songs are also different from an alma mater or school song which is a patronal song for an educational institution and usually has a slower tempo.

List of college fight songs
Many colleges have unofficial fight songs or have changed their official song over the years. Additionally, some colleges have rally songs, spirit songs, cheer songs, and alma maters. This list is exclusively for the fight song or songs currently approved by the institution, even if played infrequently.

Canada

Japan

Mexico

United States

List of professional sports team fight songs

Australia

Canada

Japan

United States

List of secondary school fight songs

Australia

Philippines

See also

List of Australian Football League team songs
Alma mater (song)
Entrance music
Football chant
List of school songs
Stadium anthem
Theme music
Music at sporting events

References

External links
College Football Fight Song Lyrics
NCAA College Football Fight Songs Music
NCAA College Football Fight Songs Ring Tone
Lyrics to College Fight Songs
College Fight Songs Music (Temporarily disabled)
Lyrics On Demand-College Fight Songs

 
Sports terminology
Sports music